Jubilee Road is the third studio album by British singer-songwriter Tom Odell. It was released on 26 October 2018. The lead single "If You Wanna Love Somebody" was released on 14 June 2018.

Background
The album was announced on 22 June 2018. The songwriting was inspired by Odell's neighbours while living in a terraced street in east London. He said about this period: “At the time I was actually thinking about taking a break from music, I was thinking about stepping back for six months, but then I moved into this house and just felt inspired by the neighbours and the community I was living in and actually wrote the album pretty quickly.” Besides the neighbourhood Odell drew inspiration from his own life as well: “The best way I can describe it is there are some characters in some of the songs – in Son of an Only Child I imagine this babysitter with this young boy and then the young boy’s older and he’s part of this lost generation and he feels angry. In another song ["Queen of Diamonds"] there’s this gambling addict who is desperately gambling to try and satisfy his own addiction but also someone else because he thinks it’s going to save him. In all of them they’re partly things I’ve observed but also they’re partly myself as well and partly things I’ve witnessed and experienced.”

Promotion
The lead single "If You Wanna Love Somebody" and its video were both released on 14 June 2018. The video was directed by Sophie Littman. Odell also performed the song on The Graham Norton Show on the day of the release. The second single "Half As Good As You" featuring German-English singer Alice Merton was released on 24 August 2018. The clip was again directed by Littman. Odell performed the duet with Merton on The Voice of Poland and with Rae Morris on The Jonathan Ross Show. Other album tracks that were released in advance of the release included the title track "Jubilee Road" as well as "You're Gonna Break My Heart Tonight" and "Go Tell Her Now". The accompanying Jubilee Road Tour started on 12 October 2018. The tour involves gigs in the UK, Europe and the United States.

Track listing
Credits adapted from the album booklet.

Personnel
Credits are adapted from Jubilee Road liner notes.

Tom Odell – vocals, piano, organ (track 2, 11), backing vocals (track 2,8,9), clicks (track 3), strings (track 11)
Max Clilverd – electric guitar (track 1-5, 7-9, 11), acoustic guitar (track 2-5, 7-11), backing vocals (track 8), dulcimer (track 10)
Max Goff – bass guitar (track 1-5, 7-9, 11)
Andrew Burrows – drums (track 1-5,7-9,11), percussion (track 1,5,7), glockenspiel (track 2, 11), backing vocals (track 2,8)
Ben Baptie – tambourine (track 2)
Michael Leonhart – trumpet (track 3)
Dave Guy – trumpet (track 3)
Maneco Ruiz – trumpet (track 3)
Mike Davis – trombone (track 3)
Matt Bauder – tenor sax (track 4)
Debbie Aramide – backing vocals (track 3, 5)
Olivia Wiliams – backing vocals (track 3, 5)
Emily Holligan – backing vocals (track 3, 5)
Joel Frahm – saxophone (track 4)
Alice Merton – vocals (track 7)

Design
Tom Odell – creative direction
Margherita Visconti – creative direction
Frank Fieber – creative direction
Joanna Weir – photography commissioning
Chris Norris – design
Sophie Green – photography
Joe Magowan – additional photography
Rianna Tamara – additional photography
Aava Anttinen – additional photography
Jonny Isaacson – additional design
Helen Frost – additional design
Kiran Mistry – additional design

Technical
Tom Odell – production, arrangements
Ben Baptie – production, engineering, mixing (track 1,3-10)
Tom Archer – recording assistant engineer (track 1, 3-6, 8-11)
Andy Menhenitt – mixing assistant engineer (track 1-10), recording assistant engineer(track 2,7)
Ted Jensen – mastering
Michael Leonhart – arrangements
Andrew Burrows – production (track 7)
Oli Barton-Wood – engineering (track 7)
Martin Terefe – production (track 11)
Mark "Spike" Stent – mixing (track 11)

Charts

References

2018 albums
Tom Odell albums